Bishop Amat may refer to:

 Thaddeus Amat y Brusi, first bishop of the Los Angeles Roman Catholic  Archdiocese
 Bishop Amat Memorial High School, a Roman Catholic secondary school named in his honor